The Queen Elizabeth II Cup (Queen Elizabeth II Commemorative Cup until 2012) is an International Grade 1 flat horse race in Japan for three-year-old and above thoroughbred fillies and mares run over a distance of 2,200 metres (approximately 1 mile 3 furlongs) on the turf at Kyoto Racecourse in November.

History
The race was first run in 1976 over a distance of 2,400 metres (1 mile 4 furlongs). It was originally for three-year-old fillies only and was the third leg of the Japanese Fillies' Triple Crown. In 1996, it was opened to older female horses and was reduced to its present distance. In the same year the Shuka Sho was established and became the third leg of the Fillies' Triple Crown.

Since 1999 it turned into International Grade 1 race. In 2010 Snow Fairy from England, being the first winner outside Japan. The following year she made Japanese flat racing history of being the first ever non-Japanese trained horse to win the same Grade 1 flat race back-to-back (second ever including Steeplechase, which Karasi winning Nakayama Grand Jump between 2005 and 2007).

It is the only Grade 1 race that is restricted to fillies and mares aged three or above. The other Grade 1 races for older female horses in Japan, the Victoria Mile, excludes three-year-olds.

Records
Most successful horse (2 wins):
 Mejiro Dober – 1998, 1999
 Admire Groove – 2003, 2004
 Snow Fairy – 2010, 2011
 Lucky Lilac – 2019, 2020

Winners since 1996

 Kawakami Princess finished first in 2006 but was demoted to 12th place following a Stewards' Inquiry.

 The 2020, 2021 and 2022 races took place at Hanshin Racecourse over a distance of 2200 metres.

Earlier winners 

 1976 – Diamante
 1977 – Inter Gloria
 1978 – Lead Swallow
 1979 – Miss Kaburaya
 1980 – Hagino Top Lady
 1981 – Agnes Tesco
 1982 – Victoria Crown
 1983 – Long Grace
 1984 – Kyowa Thunder
 1985 – Reward Wing
 1986 – Mejiro Ramonu
 1987 – Talented Girl
 1988 – Miyama Poppy
 1989 – Sand Peeress
 1990 – Kyoei Tap
 1991 – Rinden Lily
 1992 – Takeno Velvet
 1993 – Hokuto Vega
 1994 – Hishi Amazon
 1995 – Sakura Candle

See also
 Horse racing in Japan
 List of Japanese flat horse races

References 
Racing Post: 

External links 
 Horse Racing in Japan

Middle distance horse races for fillies and mares
Turf races in Japan